The 1st Florida Special Cavalry Battalion, nicknamed Cow Cavalry, was a Confederate States Army cavalry unit from Florida during the American Civil War. Commanded by Charles James Munnerlyn; it was organized to protect herds of cattle from Union raiders.  The hides and meat from Florida cattle was a critical supply item for the Confederacy. 

James McKay wrote to the state of the need to protect Florida cattle after the Battle of Olustee, and a group of Florida crackers was organized near Plant City, and were based out of Fort Myers, taking part in the Battle of Fort Myers. They would drive cattle to Baldwin. John T. Lesley, Francis A. Hendry, and W. B. Henderson were all in the Cow Cavalry.

See also
List of Florida Confederate Civil War units

References

External links
1st Battalion Florida Special Cavalry
 
 

Florida in the American Civil War
Units and formations of the Confederate States Army from Florida